is a three piece Japanese band. They are also known by their initials SSS. The band was part of Sony's SME Records label until 2011. Their first album, was released on 15 November 2006. Their music have been used for a variety of anime series, namely: 2nd ending theme for Big Windup!, ending theme for Beet the Vandel Buster, 2nd ending theme for Code Geass, and the 6th and 21st ending themes of Bleach.

Members

Plays the piano.

Vocals.

Plays the guitar.

Discography

Singles
 (June 1, 2005)
 - theme song of Kansai TV and Fuji TV's drama series, 
EVERY day
 (January 25, 2006)
  (5th ED theme of TV Tokyo's Beet the Vandel Buster)

 (March 1, 2006)
 (6th ED theme of TV Tokyo's anime series BLEACH)

 (July 5, 2006)

 (October 18, 2006)

 (February 28, 2007)
 (2nd ED theme song of CODE GEASS "Mosaic Kakera")

 - ~Premium Live Ver.~Recorded at Shibuya BOXX on 15 Nov 2006
 - CODE GEASS Ending Ver.

 (August 22, 2007)
 (2nd ED theme song of Ōkiku Furikabutte)

Top Of The Morning
 - Ōkiku Furikabutte Ver.

Passion (March 5, 2008)
Passion
 (November 5, 2008)

 - ~2008.08.24 HIBIYA YA-ON VERSION~
 (January 13, 2010)
 (21st ED theme song of BLEACH)

Albums
 (November 15, 2006)

I KNOW

HOMERUN

PASSION (July 23, 2008)

I Love You

Good Morning
Bye-Bye

Smile
I'm Sorry

HERO

PASSION
 (February 17, 2010)

La Digo

Heart

External links
SunSet Swish official site 

Sony Music Entertainment Japan artists
Japanese rock music groups
Japanese pop rock music groups
Musical groups from Osaka
Japanese boy bands